

Offseason 
 Prior to 1946 season: Stan Lopata was signed as an amateur free agent by the Phillies.

Preseason 
The Phillies held spring training in Miami Beach, Florida, returning to Flamingo Field where the team had trained from 1940 to 1942 before WWII travel restrictions kept teams close to home. The team stayed at the Boulevard Hotel at Dade Blvd and Meridian Ave. The Phillies held minor league camp in Dover, Delaware.

Regular season 
For the first time in the 1946 season, the Philadelphia Phillies made use of airplanes to travel between cities in the regular season. The Phillies chartered two planes and returned to Philadelphia from Chicago following the scheduled June 12 game against the Cubs.

In June 1946, the Cleveland American League club was sold to Bill Veeck and a note soon appeared in the Sporting News that the team was considering a spring training move to Tucson, Arizona for 1947. Paul Ficht, secretary of the Clearwater Chamber of Commerce, along with Mayor J.C. House, and City Manager F.L. Hendrix spoke with the St. Louis Browns, Newark Bears, Kansas City Blues, and Phillies about training in Clearwater in 1947. On July 27, 1946, Hendrix announced that the Phillies had accepted Clearwater's invitation to train at Clearwater Athletic Field in 1947 on a one-year agreement.

Season standings

Record vs. opponents

Roster

Player stats

Batting

Starters by position 
Note: Pos = Position; G = Games played; AB = At bats; H = Hits; Avg. = Batting average; HR = Home runs; RBI = Runs batted in

Other batters 
Note: G = Games played; AB = At bats; H = Hits; Avg. = Batting average; HR = Home runs; RBI = Runs batted in

Pitching

Starting pitchers 
Note: G = Games pitched; IP = Innings pitched; W = Wins; L = Losses; ERA = Earned run average; SO = Strikeouts

Other pitchers 
Note: G = Games pitched; IP = Innings pitched; W = Wins; L = Losses; ERA = Earned run average; SO = Strikeouts

Relief pitchers 
Note: G = Games pitched; W = Wins; L = Losses; SV = Saves; ERA = Earned run average; SO = Strikeouts

Farm system

Notes

References 
1946 Philadelphia Phillies season at Baseball Reference

Philadelphia Phillies seasons
Philadelphia Phillies season
Philadelphia